Hikawera Te Kurapa (1907–1985) was a notable New Zealand tribal tohunga, horse-breaker, farmer and ringatu leader. Of Māori descent, he identified with the Tūhoe iwi. He was born in Ruatoki, Bay of Plenty, New Zealand in 1907.

References

1907 births
1985 deaths
Tohunga
New Zealand Ringatū clergy
Ngāi Tūhoe people
People from Ruatoki